Peter Eleftherios Baker (born July 2, 1967) is an American journalist and author. He is the chief White House correspondent for The New York Times and a political analyst for MSNBC, and was previously a reporter for The Washington Post for 20 years. Baker has covered five presidencies, from Bill Clinton through Joe Biden.

Early life and education
Baker was born in 1967, the son of Linda Gross (later Sinrod) and E. P. Baker. His mother was a computer programmer and his father was an attorney. Baker attended Oberlin College from 1984 to 1986, where he worked as a reporter and editor for the student newspaper, The Oberlin Review. Baker left Oberlin at the school's insistence because, according to him, he "was not a good student." Baker never completed the coursework for an earned degree, although he was granted an honorary Doctor of Fine Arts by the university in 2021.

Career
After college, Baker worked for The Washington Times for two years. He then joined The Washington Post in 1988 as a reporter covering Virginia news. He spent 20 years there, covering the White House during the presidencies of Bill Clinton and George W. Bush. During his first tour at the White House, Baker co-authored the paper's first story about the Clinton-Lewinsky scandal and served as the paper's lead writer during the subsequent impeachment battle. He subsequently published his first book, The Breach: Inside the Impeachment and Trial of William Jefferson Clinton through Scribner, a New York Times bestseller based on his coverage of the impeachment proceedings in Congress. During his next White House assignment, he covered the travails of Bush's second term, from the Iraq War and Hurricane Katrina to Supreme Court nomination fights and the economy.

In between stints at the White House, Baker and his wife, Susan Glasser, spent four years as Moscow bureau chiefs, chronicling the rise of Vladimir Putin, the rollback of Russian democracy, the Second Chechen War, the terrorist attack on a theater in Moscow, and the Beslan school hostage crisis. Baker also covered the wars in Afghanistan and Iraq. He was the first American newspaper journalist to report from rebel-held northern Afghanistan after September 11, 2001, and he spent the next eight months covering the overthrow of the Taliban and the emergence of a new government. He later spent six months in the Middle East, reporting from inside Saddam Hussein's Iraq and around the region before embedding with the U.S. Marines as they drove toward Baghdad.

In May 2005, Baker published his second book, Kremlin Rising: Vladimir Putin's Russia and the End of Revolution through Scribner, with Susan Glasser, a detailed accounting of Vladimir Putin's consolidation of power during his first term as President of Russia. It was later named one of the Best Books of 2005 by The Washington Post Book World. While serving as White House correspondent for The Washington Post, he won the Gerald R. Ford Journalism Prize for Distinguished Reporting on the Presidency in 2007 for his "exceptionally trenchant appraisal" of the achievements and shortfalls of the second year of President George W. Bush's second term in office.

In 2008, after 20 years with The Washington Post, Baker began working for The New York Times. He received the 2011 Aldo Beckman Memorial Award for his "remarkable run" of detailed coverage of the second year of President Obama's first term. He again won the Gerald R. Ford Journalism Prize for Distinguished Reporting on the Presidency and the Aldo Beckman Memorial Award in 2015.

In October 2013, Baker published his third book, Days of Fire: Bush and Cheney in the White House through Doubleday, a detailed narrative account of the two-term presidency of George W. Bush. Shortly thereafter, it was listed as one of the 10 Best Books of 2013 by The New York Times Book Review. In June 2017, he published his fourth book, Obama: The Call of History through New York Times/Callaway, a coffeetable volume about President Obama's two terms in office. In November 2017, it was nominated for an NAACP Image Award for Outstanding Literary Work - Biography/Autobiography.

After being briefly assigned as Jerusalem bureau chief for the Times, in December 2016, Baker was reassigned back to the White House beat for the incoming Trump administration.

In October 2018, Baker published a book with Random House entitled Impeachment: An American History, along with Jon Meacham, Timothy Naftali, and Jeffrey A. Engel. An updated and greatly expanded version of the Obama book will be published as a regular book in May 2019. He and Glasser also wrote a biography of former Secretary of State James A. Baker III published by Doubleday in 2020.

In addition to his work for MSNBC, Baker is a regular panelist on PBS's Washington Week.

In September 2022, a third book authored with his wife, Susan Glasser, entitled The Divider: Trump in the White House, 2017-2021 was published.

Works
 
 
 
 
Impeachment: An American History. Random House. 2018.

Personal life
In 2000, he married Susan Glasser in a civil ceremony.[2] His wife has been a reporter and assistant managing editor at The Washington Post, the editor-in-chief of Foreign Policy magazine, the founding editor of Politico Magazine and the editor of Politico. She is now a staff writer for The New Yorker and author of its Letter from Trump's Washington as well as a global affairs analyst for CNN. They live in Washington, D.C.

Their son, Theo Baker, became the youngest person to win a Polk Award after reporting he performed at the age of eighteen regarding allegations that some research papers by Marc Tessier-Lavigne, the president of Stanford University, had manipulated images.

References

External links

 

1967 births
20th-century American journalists
20th-century American male writers
21st-century American journalists
American male journalists
American political journalists
American television journalists
Journalists from Washington, D.C.
Living people
MSNBC people
Oberlin College alumni
People from Falls Church, Virginia
Place of birth missing (living people)
The New York Times writers
The Washington Post people
The Washington Times people